Back Shore was a locality located west of Cape Freels. The name was approved by the Newfoundland Geographical Names Board on July 29, 1982.

See also 
 List of ghost towns in Newfoundland and Labrador

Ghost towns in Newfoundland and Labrador